The striped hairy-nosed bat (Mimon crenulatum) is a bat species found in Brazil, Colombia, Ecuador, French Guiana, Guyana, Suriname and Venezuela.

References

Bats of South America
Bats of Brazil
Mammals of Colombia
Phyllostomidae
Bats of Central America
Mammals described in 1810
Taxa named by Étienne Geoffroy Saint-Hilaire